A Los Campesinos! Christmas is a Christmas EP released by Welsh indie pop band Los Campesinos! on 8 December 2014. The record compiles Christmas songs from past years, in addition to new tracks and a cover of Mud's 1974 Christmas number one "Lonely This Christmas".

It was released through Turnstile and Heart Swells via iTunes and on 12-inch vinyl, pressed on white, with a CD copy and Christmas card (designed by Rob Taylor) signed by the band included. In 2021, the band re-released the EP on cassette.

Track listing

References 

2014 EPs
Los Campesinos! albums
2014 Christmas albums
Christmas albums by Welsh artists
Christmas EPs
Pop Christmas albums